Kerstin Peters (born 27 July 1967) is a German rowing coxswain. She competed in the women's eight event at the 1988 Summer Olympics.

References

1967 births
Living people
German female rowers
Olympic rowers of West Germany
Rowers at the 1988 Summer Olympics
Rowers from Berlin
Coxswains (rowing)